Peter Gerhard (1920 – 15 February 2006, Fayence, France) was a historical geographer whose work focused on colonial Mexico or New Spain. He pursued graduate studies at University of California, Berkeley, and was influenced by Carl O. Sauer and Herbert Bolton.

Publications

Books

Articles

References

1920 births
2006 deaths
Historical geographers
Historians of Mexico
University of California, Berkeley alumni